Michael Brandt (born October 1, 1968) is an American writer and director.

Life and career
Brandt is an alumnus of Baylor University in Waco, Texas, where as an undergrad he earned a BBA and in graduate school earned Master of Arts in Communication Studies, with a concentration in Film.  His Master's Thesis focused on digital nonlinear editing and the effects of the tool on the final film product. While studying at Baylor, Brandt met frequent collaborator Derek Haas. In the late 1990s, Brandt and Haas began collaborating on screenplays long distance, while Haas lived and worked in Atlanta.

They optioned their first spec script, The Courier, in 1999 while Brandt was working as an assistant editor for Robert Rodriguez on the set of The Faculty in Austin, Texas. In the director's commentary on the Spy Kids DVD, Rodriguez shared that he was impressed that Brandt never revealed he had written a script that had Hollywood interest during his time on set, not wanting to muddy the waters of his working relationship with Rodriguez.

Brandt and Haas' first production, 2003's 2 Fast 2 Furious with Universal, amassed over $236 million worldwide and launched their career. The duo went on to write the remake of the Elmore Leonard short story 3:10 To Yuma, starring Russell Crowe and Christian Bale and directed by James Mangold. Yuma opened at #1 at the box office in September 2007 and received wide critical acclaim. In 2009, the Brandt and Haas adaptation of Wanted starring James McAvoy, Morgan Freeman and Angelina Jolie grossed more than $404 million worldwide.

In 2011 Brandt made his directorial debut with his and Haas's original screenplay The Double, starring Richard Gere, Topher Grace and Martin Sheen. Most recently, Brandt and Haas were the executive producers of the NBC drama Chicago Fire, along with Dick Wolf. He also wrote the script and produce the film Overdrive. He now has three children, Sadie James Brandt, Ruby Katherine Brandt, and Decker Harold Brandt.

Filmography
Film

Television

References 

American male screenwriters
Baylor University alumni
Living people
1968 births
Chicago (franchise)